Wadigi is a tiny islet within the Mamanuca Islands of Fiji in the South Pacific. The islands are a part of the Fiji's Western Division.

Geography
The islet is just 10 minutes by helicopter from the Nadi International Airport. There is a private resort there. The islet has two pristine beaches for swimming, diving, and snorkelling.

References

External links
Wadigi Resort

Islands of Fiji
Mamanuca Islands